Damien Michael Hennessy Schiff (born June 4, 1979) is an American lawyer. Currently a senior attorney at the Pacific Legal Foundation, he is a former nominee to be a judge of the United States Court of Federal Claims.

Education and career 
Schiff received his Bachelor of Arts degree, magna cum laude, from Georgetown University and his Juris Doctor, magna cum laude, from the University of San Diego School of Law in 2004. He started his legal career as a law clerk for Judge Victor J. Wolski of the United States Court of Federal Claims.

Schiff litigated Sackett v. Environmental Protection Agency. In 2014, he litigated to end federal protections for the California gnatcatcher, arguing DNA evidence showed it was not a distinct sub-species.

Failed nomination to Court of Federal Claims 

On May 8, 2017, President Trump nominated Schiff to serve as a Judge of the United States Court of Federal Claims, to the seat vacated by Judge George W. Miller, who retired in 2013. A hearing on his nomination before the Senate Judiciary Committee took place on June 14, 2017. On July 13, 2017, his nomination was reported out of committee by a vote of 11–9. On January 3, 2018, his nomination was returned to the President under Rule XXXI, Paragraph 6 of the United States Senate. On January 5, 2018, the White House renominated 21 of 26 federal judicial nominees who had been returned by the U.S. Senate. Schiff was not among the 21 individuals who were renominated.

See also 
 Donald Trump judicial appointment controversies

References

External links 
 Appearances at the U.S. Supreme Court from the Oyez Project
 Biography at the Pacific Legal Foundation

1979 births
Living people
21st-century American lawyers
California lawyers
Federalist Society members
Georgetown University alumni
People from San Jose, California
University of San Diego School of Law alumni